1669 Dagmar, provisional designation , is a rare-type Themistian asteroid from the outer region of the asteroid belt, approximately 42 kilometers in diameter. It was discovered on 7 September 1934, by German astronomer Karl Reinmuth at Heidelberg Observatory in southern Germany, and named after a common German feminine name.

Classification and orbit 

The asteroid is a member of the Themis family, a large group of asteroids in the outer main-belt. It orbits the Sun at a distance of 2.8–3.5 AU once every 5 years and 7 months (2,032 days). Its orbit has an eccentricity of 0.11 and an inclination of 1° with respect to the ecliptic. As no precoveries were taken, and no prior identifications were made, Dagmars observation arc begins with its official discovery observation.

Physical characteristics 

Dagmar has a rare spectra of a G-type asteroid (or Cg-type in the SMASS taxonomy), similar to 1 Ceres, the largest asteroid and only dwarf planet in the asteroid belt.

Rotation period 

Astronomer Federico Manzini obtained a provisional lightcurve of Dagmar from photometric observations in March 2004. It gave a tentative rotation period of 12 hours with a brightness variation of 0.15 magnitude. As of 2017, no secure period has yet been published.

Diameter and albedo 

According to the surveys carried out by the Infrared Astronomical Satellite IRAS, the Japanese Akari satellite, and NASA's Wide-field Infrared Survey Explorer with its subsequent NEOWISE mission, Dagmar measures between 35.78 and 45.194 kilometers in diameter, and its surface has an albedo between 0.035 and 0.057. The Collaborative Asteroid Lightcurve Link adopts the results obtained by 17 observations made by IRAS, that is an albedo of 0.0565 and a diameter of 35.78 kilometers with an absolute magnitude of 10.97.

Naming 

This minor planet was named by the discoverer after a common German feminine name. No special meaning is assigned to this name. The official  was published by the Minor Planet Center on 15 December 1968.

References

External links 
 Asteroid Lightcurve Database (LCDB), query form (info )
 Dictionary of Minor Planet Names, Google books
 Asteroids and comets rotation curves, CdR – Observatoire de Genève, Raoul Behrend
 Discovery Circumstances: Numbered Minor Planets (1)-(5000)  – Minor Planet Center
 
 

001669
Discoveries by Karl Wilhelm Reinmuth
Named minor planets
001669
19340907